"Burned Like a Rocket" is a song written by Gary Burr, and recorded by American country music artist Billy Joe Royal.  It was released in October 1985 as the first single from the album Looking Ahead.  The song reached number 10 on the Billboard Hot Country Singles & Tracks chart. It was Royal's first Top 10 hit on that chart, and his first charting single overall since 1978.

Atlantic Records withdrew the single after the Space Shuttle Challenger disaster in January 1986.

Chart performance

References

1986 singles
1985 songs
Billy Joe Royal songs
Songs written by Gary Burr
Atlantic Records singles